The two-lined climbing salamander (Bolitoglossa biseriata), also known as the two-lined mushroomtongue salamander, is a species of salamander in the family Plethodontidae. It is found in Panama, western Colombia and northwestern Ecuador.
Its natural habitat is humid lowland forest. It is arboreal, living in bromeliads and heliconias. It is threatened by habitat loss.

References

Bolitoglossa
Amphibians of Colombia
Amphibians of Ecuador
Amphibians of Panama
Amphibians described in 1962
Taxa named by Wilmer W. Tanner
Taxonomy articles created by Polbot